This is a list of mayors of Sudbury, Ontario, including the suburban communities that were amalgamated with Sudbury to create the city of Greater Sudbury on January 1, 2001.

Town of Sudbury (1893–1930)

City of Sudbury (1930–2000)

City of Greater Sudbury (2001–present)

Regional Municipality of Sudbury (1973–2000)

Capreol
(independent town 1918-1973, town within Regional Municipality of Sudbury 1973-2000)
 P. Kilgour 1927-1928
 B. M. Robinson 1931
 W. Gibson 1932-1935
 James E. Coyne 1936-1943
 W. Gibson 1944-1946
 Alistair MacLean 1947-1952
 W. Gibson 1953-1954 
 Harold Prescott 1955-1969
 Norman Fawcett 1969-1973
 Harold Prescott 1973-1975
 Frank Mazzuca 1975-1997
 Dave Kilgour 1997-2000

Nickel Centre
 Mike Solski (1973–1979)
 Gary Lacey (1979–1982)
 Stan Hayduk (1982–1997)
 John Fera (1997–2000)

Coniston
(independent town 1934-1973)

 Edgar T. Austin  (1934–1946)
 Roy Snitch (1947–1952)
 Walter Kilimnik (1953–1957)
 William Evershed (1958–1959)
 Maurice Beauchemin (1960–1962)
 Mike Solski (1963–1973) - Elected mayor of the new town of Nickel Centre on the amalgamation of the independent towns of Coniston, Garson, Wahnapitae, Falconbridge, and Skead.

Falconbridge
(independent town 1957–1973)
 John Franklin (1957–1973)

Onaping Falls
 Earl Gilchrist
 James Coady (1973–1983, mayor of Levack: 1964-1973)
 Robert Parker
 Shirley Mirka
 Jean Guy Quesnel

Rayside-Balfour
 Gilles Pelland (1972-1988)
 Lionel Lalonde (1988-2000)

Valley East
(Town, 1973–1997, City 1997-2000)
 Ray Plourde
 Howard Armstrong
 Jean-Yves 'John' Robert

Walden
 Tom Davies, 1973-1981
 Alex Fex, 1981-1982
 Charlie White, 1982-1991
 Terry Kett, 1991-1997
 Dick Johnstone, 1997-2000

References

Sudbury, Ontario